Delias berinda, the dark Jezebel is a medium-sized butterfly of the family Pieridae, that is, the yellows and whites. The species was first described by Frederic Moore in 1872.

See also
List of butterflies of India
List of butterflies of India (Pieridae)

References
 

berinda
Butterflies of Asia
Butterflies of Indochina
Butterflies described in 1872
Taxa named by Frederic Moore